Tabernaemontana salzmannii is a species of plant in the family Apocynaceae. It is found in eastern Brazil.Tabernaemontana salzmannii is a semideciduous shrub or tree with an oval crown; it can grow up to 11 metres tall.

References

salzmannii